This is a list of electoral division results for the Australian 1983 federal election.

Overall

New South Wales

Banks 
This section is an excerpt from Electoral results for the Division of Banks § 1983

Barton 
This section is an excerpt from Electoral results for the Division of Barton § 1983

Bennelong 
This section is an excerpt from Electoral results for the Division of Bennelong § 1983

Berowra 
This section is an excerpt from Electoral results for the Division of Berowra § 1983

Blaxland 
This section is an excerpt from Electoral results for the Division of Blaxland § 1983

Bradfield 
This section is an excerpt from Electoral results for the Division of Bradfield § 1983

Calare 
This section is an excerpt from Electoral results for the Division of Calare § 1983

Chifley 
This section is an excerpt from Electoral results for the Division of Chifley § 1983

Cook 
This section is an excerpt from Electoral results for the Division of Cook § 1983

Cowper 
This section is an excerpt from Electoral results for the Division of Cowper § 1983

Cunningham 
This section is an excerpt from Electoral results for the Division of Cunningham § 1983

Dundas 
This section is an excerpt from Electoral results for the Division of Dundas § 1983

Eden-Monaro 
This section is an excerpt from Electoral results for the Division of Eden-Monaro § 1983

Farrer 
This section is an excerpt from Electoral results for the Division of Farrer § 1983

Grayndler 
This section is an excerpt from Electoral results for the Division of Grayndler § 1983

Gwydir 
This section is an excerpt from Electoral results for the Division of Gwydir § 1983

Hughes 
This section is an excerpt from Electoral results for the Division of Hughes § 1983

Hume 
This section is an excerpt from Electoral results for the Division of Hume § 1983

Hunter 
This section is an excerpt from Electoral results for the Division of Hunter § 1983

Kingsford Smith 
This section is an excerpt from Electoral results for the Division of Kingsford Smith § 1983

Lowe 
This section is an excerpt from Electoral results for the Division of Lowe § 1983

Lyne 
This section is an excerpt from Electoral results for the Division of Lyne § 1983

Macarthur 
This section is an excerpt from Electoral results for the Division of Macarthur § 1983

Mackellar 
This section is an excerpt from Electoral results for the Division of Mackellar § 1983

Macquarie 
This section is an excerpt from Electoral results for the Division of Macquarie § 1983

Mitchell 
This section is an excerpt from Electoral results for the Division of Mitchell § 1983

New England 
This section is an excerpt from Electoral results for the Division of New England § 1983

Newcastle 
This section is an excerpt from Electoral results for the Division of Newcastle1983

North Sydney 
This section is an excerpt from Electoral results for the Division of North Sydney § 1983

Parramatta 
This section is an excerpt from Electoral results for the Division of Parramatta § 1983

Paterson 
This section is an excerpt from Electoral results for the Division of Paterson § 1983

Phillip 
This section is an excerpt from Electoral results for the Division of Phillip § 1983

Prospect 
This section is an excerpt from Electoral results for the Division of Prospect § 1983

Reid
This section is an excerpt from Electoral results for the Division of Reid § 1983

Richmond 
This section is an excerpt from Electoral results for the Division of Richmond § 1983

Riverina 
This section is an excerpt from Electoral results for the Division of Riverina § 1983

Robertson 
This section is an excerpt from Electoral results for the Division of Robertson § 1983

Shortland 
This section is an excerpt from Electoral results for the Division of Shortland § 1983

St George 
This section is an excerpt from Electoral results for the Division of St George § 1983

Sydney 
This section is an excerpt from Electoral results for the Division of Sydney § 1983

Warringah 
This section is an excerpt from Electoral results for the Division of Warringah § 1983

Wentworth 
This section is an excerpt from Electoral results for the Division of Wentworth § 1983

Werriwa 
This section is an excerpt from Electoral results for the Division of Werriwa § 1983

Victoria

Balaclava 
This section is an excerpt from Electoral results for the Division of Balaclava § 1983

Ballaarat 
This section is an excerpt from Electoral results for the Division of Ballarat § 1983

Batman 
This section is an excerpt from Electoral results for the Division of Batman § 1983

Bendigo 
This section is an excerpt from Electoral results for the Division of Bendigo § 1983

Bruce 
This section is an excerpt from Electoral results for the Division of Bruce § 1983

Burke 
This section is an excerpt from Electoral results for the Division of Burke (1969–2004) § 1983

Casey 
This section is an excerpt from Electoral results for the Division of Casey § 1983

Chisholm 
This section is an excerpt from Electoral results for the Division of Chisholm § 1983

Corangamite 
This section is an excerpt from Electoral results for the Division of Corangamite § 1983

Corio 
This section is an excerpt from Electoral results for the Division of Corio § 1983

Deakin 
This section is an excerpt from Electoral results for the Division of Deakin § 1983

Diamond Valley 
This section is an excerpt from Electoral results for the Division of Diamond Valley § 1983

Flinders 
This section is an excerpt from Electoral results for the Division of Flinders § 1983

Gellibrand 
This section is an excerpt from Electoral results for the Division of Gellibrand § 1983

Gippsland 
This section is an excerpt from Electoral results for the Division of Gippsland § 1983

Henty 
This section is an excerpt from Electoral results for the Division of Henty § 1983

Higgins 
This section is an excerpt from Electoral results for the Division of Higgins § 1983

Holt 
This section is an excerpt from Electoral results for the Division of Holt § 1983

Hotham 
This section is an excerpt from Electoral results for the Division of Hotham § 1983

Indi 
This section is an excerpt from Electoral results for the Division of Indi § 1983

Isaacs 
This section is an excerpt from Electoral results for the Division of Isaacs § 1983

Kooyong 
This section is an excerpt from Electoral results for the Division of Kooyong § 1983

La Trobe 
This section is an excerpt from Electoral results for the Division of La Trobe § 1983

Lalor 
This section is an excerpt from Electoral results for the Division of Lalor § 1983

Mallee 
This section is an excerpt from Electoral results for the Division of Mallee § 1983

Maribyrnong 
This section is an excerpt from Electoral results for the Division of Maribyrnong § 1983

McMillan 
This section is an excerpt from Electoral results for the Division of McMillan § 1983

Melbourne 
This section is an excerpt from Electoral results for the Division of Melbourne § 1983

Melbourne Ports 
This section is an excerpt from Electoral results for the Division of Melbourne Ports § 1983

Murray 
This section is an excerpt from Electoral results for the Division of Murray § 1983

Scullin 
This section is an excerpt from Electoral results for the Division of Scullin § 1983

Wannon 
This section is an excerpt from Electoral results for the Division of Wannon § 1983

Wills 
This section is an excerpt from Electoral results for the Division of Wills § 1983

Queensland

Bowman 
This section is an excerpt from Electoral results for the Division of Bowman § 1983

Brisbane 
This section is an excerpt from Electoral results for the Division of Brisbane § 1983

Capricornia 
This section is an excerpt from Electoral results for the Division of Capricornia § 1983

Darling Downs 
This section is an excerpt from Electoral results for the Division of Darling Downs § 1983

Dawson 
This section is an excerpt from Electoral results for the Division of Dawson § 1983

Fadden 
This section is an excerpt from Electoral results for the Division of Fadden § 1983

Fisher 
This section is an excerpt from Electoral results for the Division of Fisher § 1983

Griffith 
This section is an excerpt from Electoral results for the Division of Griffith § 1983

Herbert 
This section is an excerpt from Electoral results for the Division of Herbert § 1983

Kennedy 
This section is an excerpt from Electoral results for the Division of Kennedy § 1983

Leichhardt 
This section is an excerpt from Electoral results for the Division of Leichhardt § 1983

Lilley 
This section is an excerpt from Electoral results for the Division of Lilley § 1983

Maranoa 
This section is an excerpt from Electoral results for the Division of Maranoa § 1983

McPherson 
This section is an excerpt from Electoral results for the Division of McPherson § 1983

Moreton 
This section is an excerpt from Electoral results for the Division of Moreton § 1983

Oxley 
This section is an excerpt from Electoral results for the Division of Oxley § 1983

Petrie 
This section is an excerpt from Electoral results for the Division of Petrie § 1983

Ryan 
This section is an excerpt from Electoral results for the Division of Ryan § 1983

Wide Bay 
This section is an excerpt from Electoral results for the Division of Wide Bay § 1983

South Australia

Adelaide 
This section is an excerpt from Electoral results for the Division of Adelaide § 1983

Barker 
This section is an excerpt from Electoral results for the Division of Barker § 1983

Bonython 
This section is an excerpt from Electoral results for the Division of Bonython § 1983

Boothby 
This section is an excerpt from Electoral results for the Division of Boothby § 1983

Grey 
This section is an excerpt from Electoral results for the Division of Grey § 1983

Hawker 
This section is an excerpt from Electoral results for the Division of Hawker § 1983

Hindmarsh 
This section is an excerpt from Electoral results for the Division of Hindmarsh § 1983

Kingston 
This section is an excerpt from Electoral results for the Division of Kingston § 1983

Port Adelaide 
This section is an excerpt from Electoral results for the Division of Port Adelaide § 1983

Sturt 
This section is an excerpt from Electoral results for the Division of Sturt § 1983

Wakefield 
This section is an excerpt from Electoral results for the Division of Wakefield § 1983

Western Australia

Canning 
This section is an excerpt from Electoral results for the Division of Canning § 1983

Curtin 
This section is an excerpt from Electoral results for the Division of Curtin § 1983

Forrest 
This section is an excerpt from Electoral results for the Division of Forrest § 1983

Fremantle 
This section is an excerpt from Electoral results for the Division of Fremantle § 1983

Kalgoorlie 
This section is an excerpt from Electoral results for the Division of Kalgoorlie § 1983

Moore 
This section is an excerpt from Electoral results for the Division of Moore § 1983

O'Connor 
This section is an excerpt from Electoral results for the Division of O'Connor § 1983

Perth 
This section is an excerpt from Electoral results for the Division of Perth § 1983

Stirling 
This section is an excerpt from Electoral results for the Division of Stirling § 1983

Swan 
This section is an excerpt from Electoral results for the Division of Swan § 1983

Tangney 
This section is an excerpt from Electoral results for the Division of Tangney § 1983

Tasmania

Bass 
This section is an excerpt from Electoral results for the Division of Bass § 1983

Braddon 
This section is an excerpt from Electoral results for the Division of Braddon § 1983

Denison 
This section is an excerpt from Electoral results for the Division of Denison § 1983

Franklin 
This section is an excerpt from Electoral results for the Division of Franklin § 1983

Wilmot 
This section is an excerpt from Electoral results for the Division of Wilmot § 1983

Australian Capital Territory

Canberra 
This section is an excerpt from Electoral results for the Division of Canberra § 1983

Fraser 
This section is an excerpt from Electoral results for the Division of Fraser (Australian Capital Territory) § 1983

Northern Territory 

This section is an excerpt from Electoral results for the Division of Northern Territory § 1983

See also 
 Candidates of the 1983 Australian federal election
 Members of the Australian House of Representatives, 1983–1984
 Results of the 1983 Australian federal election (Senate)

References 

House of Representatives 1983